Tamim Iqbal is a Bangladeshi international cricketer. He made his ODI debut in 2007 against Zimbabwe and Test debut against New Zealand in 2008. Tamim has scored centuries in all three formats of the game.

On 22 March 2008, Tamim scored his first international century against Ireland in an ODI match played at Sher-e-Bangla National Cricket Stadium, which helped his team to sweep the ODI series by 3–0.

In July 2009, He scored his first test century at Arnos Vale Stadium in St. Vincent against West Indies in their second innings of the first test, helping his team to seal a victory against West Indies, which was their first test victory in a away match against any opponent except Zimbabwe.

On 13 March 2016, in the first round of 2016 ICC World Twenty20, he scored his first T20I century against Oman at HPCA Stadium, Dharmashala, being the first and only Bangladeshi batter so far to score a century in T20I as well as at the ICC Men's T20 World Cup.

, Tamim is also Bangladesh's highest century maker in international matches with 25 centuries, combining all forms of cricket.

Key

Test cricket centuries

ODI centuries

T20I centuries

References

External links
 Player's Profile at ESPNCricinfo
 Player's Profile at Cricbuzz

Lists of international cricket centuries by player
Bangladeshi cricket lists